Son Min-han (born January 2, 1975, in Busan, South Korea) is a retired South Korean starting pitcher who played 15 seasons in the KBO League. He was a long-time member of the South Korea national baseball team, pitching in the 1994 Asian Games, the 1996 Summer Olympics, the 2000 Summer Olympics, the 2006 World Baseball Classic, and the 2009 World Baseball Classic. He batted and threw right-handed.

Son attended Busan High School and Korea University.

Son was a member of the South Korea national baseball team in the 1996 Summer Olympics, where they finished eighth in the baseball tournament. Four years later he was a member of the South Korean baseball team that won the bronze medal at the 2000 Summer Olympics.

Son led the KBO League in victories and earned run average in 2005, winning both the KBO League Most Valuable Player Award and the KBO League Golden Glove Award for a season in which he went 18-7, with a 2.46 ERA and 105 strikeouts.

He played for South Korea in both the 2006 World Baseball Classic and the 2009 World Baseball Classic.

Son didn't play in the KBO from 2010 to 2012. When he returned to the league, he signed with the NC Dinos, for whom he played until the 2015 season, when he was 40 years old.

See also 
 List of KBO career win leaders

External links 

 profile

2009 World Baseball Classic players
2006 World Baseball Classic players
Baseball players at the 2000 Summer Olympics
Baseball players at the 1996 Summer Olympics
Olympic bronze medalists for South Korea
Olympic baseball players of South Korea
Lotte Giants players
NC Dinos players
KBO League Most Valuable Player Award winners
KBO League pitchers
South Korean baseball players
Korea University alumni
1975 births
Living people
Olympic medalists in baseball
Asian Games medalists in baseball
Baseball players at the 1994 Asian Games
Baseball players at the 2006 Asian Games
Busan High School alumni
Asian Games silver medalists for South Korea
Asian Games bronze medalists for South Korea
Medalists at the 1994 Asian Games
Medalists at the 2006 Asian Games
Sportspeople from Busan
Medalists at the 2000 Summer Olympics